Michael Barry Botha (born ) is a South African professional rugby union player who currently plays for the  in the Pro14 and the  in the Currie Cup and the Rugby Challenge. His regular position is fullback.

References

South African rugby union players
Living people
1997 births
People from Hibiscus Coast Local Municipality
Rugby union fullbacks
Eastern Province Elephants players
Southern Kings players
Rugby union players from KwaZulu-Natal